Sitabinji railway station is a railway station on the East Coast Railway network in the state of Odisha, India. It serves Sitabinji village. Its code is STBJ. It has two platforms. Passenger, MEMU, Express trains halt at Sitabinji railway station.

Major trains
 Puri-Barbil Express
 Kendujhar (KDJR) to Bhubaneswar(BBS) first passenger / train number 58425
 Bhubaneswar (BBS) to Kendujhar (KDJR) first passenger / train number 58426

See also
 Kendujhar district

References

Railway stations in Kendujhar district
Khurda Road railway division